Vallenay is a commune in the Cher department in the Centre-Val de Loire region of France.

Geography
The A71 autoroute runs through the commune’s eastern territory.

Population

Sights
 The priory church of St. Martin, dating from the twelfth century.
 The chateau of Bigny.
 The chateau du Preuil.
 A forge ‘La Petite Forge’ at Bigny.
 Old limekilns.
 A seventeenth-century chapel at Bigny.

See also
Communes of the Cher department

References

External links

Official Vallenay website 
Annuaire Mairie website 

Communes of Cher (department)